The Adwa Victory Day is a national holiday in Ethiopia which is celebrated on 2 March, in commemoration of Ethiopian victory against Italy's colonization effort at the Battle of Adwa in 1896. Paying tribute to the Ethiopian army, the celebration involves parades and dramatic and artistic performances reflecting Ethiopian culture and related subjects.

The Adwa Victory Day is strongly associated with symbol of Pan-Africanism and aspiration to black people.

Celebration
Celebration involves parades in many places and cultural reflection wherever people gathered. Artistic and dramatic performances are also presented, such as kererto, shilela and fukera. All schools, banks, post offices and government offices are closed, with the exception of health facilities. Some taxi  and public transportation services choose not to operate on this day, and shops are normally open but most close earlier than usual. In the capital Addis Ababa, government officials, patriots, foreign diplomats and the public gather at Menelik Square while Ethiopian Police Orchestra play patriotic songs.

Male performers often wear Jodhpurs and various types of vest; they carry the Ethiopian flag and various patriotic banners and placards, as well as traditional Ethiopian shields and swords called Shotel. Female performers wear traditional dress called Habesha kemis and some wear black gowns over all, while other place royal crowns on their heads to represent Empress Taytu. The celebration takes place not only in Addis Ababa , but also other cities such as Bahir Dar, Debre Markos and Adwa itself. Patriotic music plays a part as well, for example Gigi's ballad dedicated to the Battle of Adwa and Teddy Afro's "Tikur Sew"  are frequently played during the celebration.

During the 2023 celebration, a clash erupted between security forces and the people involving the dispersion of tear gas. Police obstructed the road leading to both squares. In St. George's Cathedral, police fired tear gas to congregants and clergies while conducting an annual feast of Saint George. One person named Mekuanent Wodaj died and many injured by stampede. Prime Minister Abiy Ahmed blamed "unspecified entities for things that gone wrong during Adwa Victory Celebration in Addis Ababa."

References

Public holidays in Ethiopia